I Believe in Unicorns is a 2014 American independent coming-of-age romantic drama film written and directed by Leah Meyerhoff. The film stars Natalia Dyer, Peter Vack, Julia Garner, Amy Seimetz and Toni Meyerhoff. The film was released on May 29, 2015, by Gravitas Ventures.

Plot
Davina is a high school freshman from Berkeley.  She lives with and takes care of her mother, who suffers from multiple sclerosis.  Her father is out of the picture, having abandoned her mother shortly after Davina was born.

Davina celebrates her 16th birthday by having a picnic at the park with her best friend, Cassidy, who gives her a camera as a birthday present.  It is there at the park where Davina discovers Sterling, a punk who hangs out with his skateboarder friends at the park's ramp.  Davina develops a crush on Sterling and takes several photographs of him with her camera.  Eventually, Sterling crosses paths with Davina and they introduce each other.  Sterling requests that they meet again the next day at a street corner nearby the park.  Davina grants his request.

Davina and Sterling spend the next day with each other.  As they get to know each other, Davina learns from Sterling that he and his mother left his father as a result of him beating them.  Davina and Sterling also confide in each other their mutual desire to be “anywhere but here.”  That night, Sterling takes Davina to his abode, located in a slum.  There they make out at first, but it gets passionate enough up to the point in which Davina performs fellatio on Sterling.  Having lost her virginity, Davina throws up and then goes home.  Davina realizes she has fallen in love with Sterling and confesses in private about her sexual episode to Cassidy.

The next evening, Davina returns to Sterling's abode, where a rave is taking place.  There, she reunites with Sterling and attempts to seduce him by kissing him and telling him that she missed him.  However, Sterling rejects her and implies that their sexual encounter was a casual fling.  Davina is heartbroken at first, but Sterling eventually apologizes to her and the two of them pursue a sexual relationship.

After contemplating for some time about being “anywhere but here,” Davina and Sterling make it official by leaving Berkeley and embarking on a road trip together.  However, as the two of them spend more time together, they start to become truculent at each other, particularly when Davina compares Sterling to his father.  At one point, Davina suggests that they head back to Berkeley, but Sterling feels intent that they carry on with their journey.

One night, Davina and Sterling spend the night squatting in a motel room. Davina asks Sterling if he really likes her or if it's just temporary, but he doesn't answer and says she's beautiful. While playing around with each other in bed, Sterling suddenly gets angrily defensive toward Davina after she slaps him.  He threatens her to never hit him again and assaults her as a warning.  The next day, Davina and Sterling go to a barn where she tells him she wants to go home.  Sterling, in response, suffers a mental breakdown and Davina attempts to comfort him out of guilt.  They make out once more and begin to have one last sexual encounter, but when she hesitates, Sterling rapes her.  Their relationship comes to a standstill and Davina returns home to her mother via a car ride from Cassidy.

Cast
Natalia Dyer as Davina
Peter Vack as Sterling
Julia Garner as Cassidy
Amy Seimetz as Clara
Toni Meyerhoff as Toni

Release
The film premiered at SXSW on March 9, 2014. The film was released on May 29, 2015, by Gravitas Ventures.

Reception 
Metacritic : 73/100

Rotten Tomatoes : 84%

The New York Times gave the film a positive review:

References

External links
 

2014 films
2014 romantic drama films
American coming-of-age films
American romantic drama films
Films about rape
American independent films
2014 independent films
2010s English-language films
2010s American films